Countess Eva Mannerheim-Sparre (1870–1957) was a Finnish book artist, designer and writer.

Personal life

Eva Mannerheim was born to the comital branch of the noble Mannerheim family, as the fifth child (of seven) of Count Carl Robert Mannerheim and Hedvig Charlotta Hélène  von Julin, at the family's Louhisaari manor.

Her eldest sister was Sophie Mannerheim, a pioneer of modern nursing and child welfare in Finland. One of their brothers was Carl Gustaf Emil Mannerheim, who later became Marshal and the 6th President of Finland.

Eva Mannerheim's mother died young, and her father remarried and moved to Paris, and she was sent to Stockholm for her schooling and later artistic and technical education, including drafting, woodblock printing and leatherwork. She returned to Finland in 1891, and began teaching leatherwork at the Ateneum art school.

In 1893, Eva Mannerheim married the Swedish artist and designer, Count Louis Sparre, with whom she had two sons.

In 1908, the family moved to Sweden; this was on account of their children's education and the political situation in Finland, although some sources suggest that the motivation was Count Sparre's disappointment at not having received public honours in Finland.

Career

Design
In the early part of her career Mannerheim-Sparre worked in the areas of technical drawing and design, including in collaboration with her husband, as Konstindustriell ritbyrå Eva & Louis Sparre ('Eva & Louise Sparre Industrial Arts Drafting Bureau'). She was also active in textile and furniture design, embroidery and related areas.

Book art
Her design and craft interests led Mannerheim-Sparre to book arts, and she is considered a pioneer of the modern book arts in Finland, and one of the leading figures of her time in the Nordic region. Her interests covered a broad range of matters including book design, bookbinding and typography. She remained active in bookbinding and design into the 1930s, when she had to give it up for health reasons following an accident.

She is also known to have planned to establish the provision of technical education in bookbinding, but her plans did not materialise.

Writing
Mannerheim-Sparre wrote several books in her life, mostly memoirs and travel journals, and especially towards the end of her career she was predominantly seen as a writer.

Her best-known book, however, is a cookery book titled Kokbok för finsmakare och vanliga hungriga ( 'Cookbook for Gourmands and the Ordinary Hungry') (Bonnier, Stockholm 1935; Finnish translation: Otava, Helsinki 1936), which has since been re-edited and printed several times.

References

1870 births
1957 deaths
Book artists
19th-century Finnish women writers
20th-century Finnish women writers
Bookbinders
Mannerheim family
Countesses
19th-century Finnish nobility
Swedish-speaking Finns
Finnish emigrants to Sweden
People from Masku